This is a list of schools currently or formerly operated by Quality Schools International.

Current schools

Former schools

References

+
Quality Schools International